Jean Bradin (30 May 1899 – 7 October 1969) was a French actor.

Bradin was born in the 5th arrondissement of Paris and died in the 15th arrondissement of Paris.

Selected filmography
 The Island of Despair (1926)
 The Bordellos of Algiers (1927)
 A Modern Dubarry (1927)
 At the Edge of the World (1927)
 Champagne (1928)
 Moulin Rouge (1928)
 Theater (1928)
 Ariadne in Hoppegarten (1928)
 Call at Midnight (1929)
 Miss Europe (1930)
 Le secret du docteur (1930)
 David Golder (1931)
 The Accomplice (1932)
 Law of the North (1939)

Bibliography
 St. Pierre, Paul Matthew. E.A. Dupont and his Contribution to British Film: Varieté, Moulin Rouge, Piccadilly, Atlantic, Two worlds, Cape Forlorn. Fairleigh Dickinson University Press, 2010

External links

1899 births
1969 deaths
French male film actors
French male silent film actors
Male actors from Paris
20th-century French male actors